The American Physical Therapy Association (APTA) is a U.S-based individual membership professional organization representing more than 100,000 member physical therapists, physical therapist assistants, and students of physical therapy. The nonprofit association, based in Alexandria, Virginia, seeks to improve the health and quality of life of individuals in society by advancing physical therapist practice, education, and research, and by increasing the awareness and understanding of physical therapy's role in the nation's health care system.

APTA annually holds two large conferences and publishes the Physical Therapy Journal, the leading international journal for research in physical therapy and related fields, and PT in Motion, a professional issues magazine providing legislative, health care, human interest, and association news.

APTA also advocates on behalf of the profession and for issues which impact the health and well being of society such as funding for health research and for an adequate health care workforce. It lobbies for health care reform to improve access to health care.

History 

APTA originally formed in 1921 as the American Women's Physical Therapeutic Association. The association was first led by President Mary McMillan, and an executive committee of elected officers governed the Association, which included 274 charter members. In 1922, the association changed its name to the American Physiotherapy Association. In 1923 the first two men were admitted into the American Physiotherapy Association. Membership grew to just under 1,000 in the late 1930s.

With the advent of World War II and a nationwide polio epidemic during the 1940s and 1950s, physical therapists were in greater demand. The Association's membership swelled to 8,000, and the number of physical therapy education programs across the U.S. increased from 16 to 39.

During the mid-1940s, the association adopted its current name, hired a full-time staff, and opened its first national office in New York City. A House of Delegates representing chapter members was established to set policies. The House elected a board of directors, previously the Executive Committee, to manage the association. In addition, sections were created to promote and develop specific objectives of the profession. Among the early sections were Schools (now the Academy of Physical Therapy Education) and Self-Employed (now the Private Practice Section).

In the 1960s, APTA membership reached 15,000, and the number of education programs nationwide grew to 52. Currently, 242 institutions offer physical therapy education programs and 364 institutions offer physical therapist assistant education programs in the United States. These numbers will change significantly in the coming years to encompass 17 developing PT programs and 18 developing PTA programs.

Combined Sections Meeting
In 1976, the association launched an annual Combined Sections Meeting, informally known as "CSM," that is attended by physical therapists from around the United States. It's so named because all of the sections of APTA meet at this time.

Previous and future CSM meetings

Chapters and sections 
APTA has chapters in most U.S. states as well as sections covering special interests. Sections are:

 Academy of Hand and Upper Extremity Physical Therapy
 Acute Care
 Aquatic Physical Therapy
 Cardiovascular & Pulmonary
 Clinical Electrophysiology and Wound Management
 Education
 Federal Physical Therapy
 Geriatrics
 Health Policy & Administration
 Home Health
 Leadership and Innovation
 Neurology
 Oncology
 Orthopaedic
 Pediatrics
 Pelvic Health
 Private Practice
 Research
 Sports Physical Therapy

See also 

 Chartered Society of Physiotherapy (United Kingdom)
 Journal of Neurologic Physical Therapy
 Journal of Orthopaedic & Sports Physical Therapy
 Journal of Physiotherapy
 Physical Therapy

References

External links 
 American Physical Therapy Association
 ChoosePT.com (APTA consumer site)
 physical-therapy-assistant.org (PTA Guide)

Medical associations based in the United States
Physiotherapy organizations
Organizations established in 1921
1921 establishments in the United States
Medical and health organizations based in Virginia
Healthcare accreditation organizations in the United States